The poets listed below were either born in the Israel or else published much of their poetry while living in that country.

A

Ada Aharoni (born 1933)
Aharon Amir (1923–2008)
Dan Armon (born 1948)
Irit Amiel (1931–2021)
Maya Arad (born 1971)
Yehuda Amichai (1924–2000)
Yaron Avitov (born 1957)
Dana Amir (born 1966)
Karen Alkalay-Gut (born 1945)
Aharon Appelfeld (1932–2018)
Lucy Ayoub (born 1992)
Naim Araidi (1950–2015)

B

Rivka Basman Ben-Hayim (born 1925)
Miri Ben-Simhon
Rachel Boymvol (1914–2000)
Avraham Ben-Yitzhak (1883–1950)
Shmuel Ben-Artzi (1914–2011)
Rachel Tzvia Back (born 1960)
Ya'qub Bilbul (1920–2003)
Erez Biton (born 1942)
Halina Birenbaum (born 1929)
Yocheved Bat-Miriam (1901–1980)

C

Sami Shalom Chetrit (born 1960)
Miriam Barukh Chalfi (1917–2002)
Edith Covensky (born 1945)
Raquel Chalfi
Inbal Eshel Cahansky (born 1977)
Ya'akov Cahan (1881–1960)
T. Carmi (1925–1994)

D

Fatima Dhiab (born 1951)

E

Yael Eisenberg (born 1991)

F

Jacob Fichman (1881–1958)
Robert Friend (1913–1998)
Ezra Fleischer (1928–2006)

G

Gilla Gerzon
Hagit Grossman (born 1976)
Michal Govrin (born 1950)
Dana Goldberg (born 1979)
Mordechai Geldman (1946–2021)
Yael Globerman (born 1954)
Amir Gilboa (1917–1984)
Haim Gouri (1923–2018)
Mikhail Gendelev (1950–2009)
Igor Guberman (born 1936)

H

Dalia Hertz (born 1942)
Benjamin Harshav (1928–2015)
Ayin Hillel (1926–1990)
Yair Hurvitz (1941–1988)
Hedva Harechavi (born 1941)
Paul Hartal (born 1936)
Amira Hess (born 1943)
Shlomo Herberg (1884–1966)
Galit Hasan-Rokem (born 1945)
Sabine Huynh (born 1972)
Tehila Hakimi (born 1982)

K

Radu Klapper (1937–2006)
Yehudit Kafri (born 1935)
Adi Keissar (born 1980)
Olga Kirsch (1924–1997)
Yuri Kolker (born 1946)
Ronen Altman Kaydar (born 1972)
Abba Kovner (1918–1987)
Shirley Kaufman (1923–2016)
Admiel Kosman (born 1957)
Nidaa Khoury (born 1959)
Shlomo Kalo (1928–2014)

L

Yitzhak Lamdan (1899–1954)
Giora Leshem (1940–2011)
Malka Locker (1887–1990)
Yitzhak Laor (born 1948)

M

Nava Macmel-Atir (born 1964)
Margalit Matitiahu (born 1935)
Agi Mishol (born 1946)
Itzik Manger (1901–1969)
Dory Manor (born 1971)
Yakir Ben Moshe (born 1973)
Efrat Mishori (born 1964)

N

Vaan Nguyen (born 1982)
Yehezkel Nafshy (born 1977)
Erich Neumann (1905–1960)
Yonit Naaman (born 1975)
Ron Nesher (born 1983)
Tal Nitzán (born 1961)
Zvi Nir (born 1946)

O

Mariya Ocher (born 1986)

P

Dan Pagis (1930–1986)
Israel Pincas (born 1935)
Hava Pinhas-Cohen (born 1955)
Ravid Plotnik (born 1988)
Haviva Pedaya (born 1957)

R

Alex Rif (born 1986)
Abraham Regelson (1896–1981)
Esther Raab (1894–1981)
Tuvya Ruebner (1924–2019)
Yonatan Ratosh (1908–1981)
Janice Rebibo (1950–2015)

S

Zoya Semenduyeva (1929–2020)
Ayat Abou Shmeiss (born 1984)
Shin Shifra (1931–2012)
Esther Shkalim (born 1954)
Avner Shats (born 1959)
Tal Slutzker (born 1986)
Zalman Shneour (1887–1959)
Gali-Dana Singer (born 1962)
Amir Segal (born 1980)
Ronny Someck (born 1951)
Avraham Shlonsky (1900–1973)
Rami Saari (born 1963)
Abraham Sutzkever (1913–2010)
Bracha Serri
Avraham Stern (1907–1942)
David Shimoni (1891–1956)
Mati Shemoelof (born 1972)
Shva Salhoov (born 1963)
Nava Semel (1954–2017)
David Dean Shulman (born 1949)
Gershom Schocken (1912–1990)

T

Gabriel Talphir (1901–1990)
Shimon Tzabar (1926–2007)
Omer Toledano (born 1980)

V

Sam Vaknin (born 1961)

W

Yona Wallach (1944–1985)

Z

Nurit Zarchi (born 1941)
Tawfiq Ziad (1929–1994)
Boaz Zippor (born 1972)
Linda Stern Zisquit
Benny Ziffer (born 1953)

See also

Israeli poetry
List of Hebrew-language poets
List of poets
List of years in poetry

 
Israel
poets